Risoul is a commune in the Hautes-Alpes department in southeastern France. It is located in the French Alps between the towns of Briançon and Gap.

Risoul is home to a ski resort that partners with the neighbouring town, Vars, to form the Forêt Blanche ski resort, located between the Queyras and Écrins national parks. The ski resort is sometimes called Risoul 1850 because it is 1,850 meters above sea level.

History

The development of a ski resort at Risoul dates from the start of the 1970s. The first lift operator (SAPAR), however, went bankrupt in 1974. The local member of parliament put the council in touch with the Société Foncière de la Vallée des Allues (SFVA). The SFVA started a company called Sermont which took over the lifts and runs them to this day.

The reasons for the bankruptcy in 1974 still loom. The Durance valley is remote, the trip from Paris by train or car a long one. The A51 motorway link is still awaiting a financial commitment, likewise, the Montgenèvre rail tunnel to connect Briançon to the TGV network. The nearest major airport is at Turin, across the border in Italy. The resort concentrates its efforts on returning clients but still lacks sufficient long-stay guests. The Forêt Blanche link with its 180 km of pistes is a major marketing tool, especially with tour operators who can include Risoul with transfers to Montgènevre and Serre Chevalier.

The resort was an early adopter of snowboarding. The Surfland snowpark existed for over a decade and is now complemented by rails for beginners and experienced users. The snow park was chosen as a training zone for the 2006 Turin Winter Olympics. The resort believes that the concept of black, red and blue run gradings is outdated and is moving to a series of themed areas such as the freeride zone.

Ski area
The resort has 55 ski lifts, including a cable car and 14 chairs. These give it an uplift capacity of 57,000 skiers per hour.

Risoul should be well placed to pick up weather systems from Italy or the Atlantic but has suffered from a lack of snow over the last couple of seasons with skiing on artificial snow at the bottom of the ski domain. 30% of the resort runs are covered by snowmaking. Risoul is looking to increase snow making capacity but there are limits to water resources in the dry Southern Alps.

The resort has earned the ‘’Petit Montagnard’’ label and its tree-lined lower slopes are ideal for family holidays. The ski school has a capacity for 60 children. The area is famed for its southern sunshine with 300 days of sun per year.

The resort

Risoul is accessible from Turin airport in Italy. It is also possible to transfer from Grenoble, Chambéry or Marseille airports, which are around 3 hours from the resort).

Risoul has a capacity of 18,600 beds in multiple apartments and chalets. SARA which is owned by SFVA runs 6,000 beds. The resort has had a refurbishment program since 2003. There are also a number of wood chalets that give a more traditional feel to the resort.

Apres-ski life encompasses a range of cafes, bars and night clubs within a compact town centre backing onto the main ski school meeting point. Outdoors there are ice-skating facilities at both Risoul and Vars, snow-shoe walks and skidoo rides. The resort also has a cinema.

In 2000 the resort was the first in Europe to host the Snowbombing dance, music and winter sports festival.

Population

References

External links

 Risoul Tourist Office
 Skiing The Alps independent review of Risoul
 French Ski School of Risoul
 Risoul Panoramas I
 Risoul Panoramas II
 Risoul Panoramas III

Ski areas and resorts in France
Communes of Hautes-Alpes
Caturiges
Hautes-Alpes communes articles needing translation from French Wikipedia